Jóhann Vilbergsson (born 20 May 1935) is an Icelandic alpine skier. He competed at the 1960 Winter Olympics and the 1964 Winter Olympics.

References

1935 births
Living people
Jóhann Vilbergsson
Jóhann Vilbergsson
Alpine skiers at the 1960 Winter Olympics
Alpine skiers at the 1964 Winter Olympics
20th-century Icelandic people